Günter Güttler (born 31 May 1961 in Erlangen) is a German former professional football player and manager.

Honours 
Bayern Munich
 Bundesliga: 1980–81
 DFB-Pokal: 1981–82
 European Cup: runner-up 1981–82

References

External links 
 

1961 births
Living people
German footballers
Association football midfielders
Bundesliga players
2. Bundesliga players
FC Bayern Munich footballers
K.V. Mechelen players
1. FC Nürnberg players
SV Waldhof Mannheim players
FC Schalke 04 players
SpVgg Greuther Fürth players
German football managers
SSV Jahn Regensburg managers
SV Wacker Burghausen managers
3. Liga managers
Sportspeople from Erlangen
Footballers from Bavaria
West German expatriate footballers
West German footballers
West German expatriate sportspeople in Belgium
Expatriate footballers in Belgium
German expatriate sportspeople in Austria
1. FC Köln non-playing staff